Ailia is a genus of catfish in the family Ailiidae native to Asia. It is called "Kajoli" or "Bahpati" in Assamese and contributes to a major catch in Brahmaputra River. It is a surface to mid water fish that is found commonly near the shoals.

Species
There are currently 2 recognized species in this genus:
Ailia coila (F. Hamilton, 1822) (Gangetic ailia) 
Ailia punctata (F. Day, 1872) (Jamuna ailia)

References

Fish of Thailand
Fish of Indonesia
Catfish genera
Taxa named by John Edward Gray
Freshwater fish genera